The Windsor Beauties are a set of portrait paintings, still in the Royal Collection, by Sir Peter Lely and his workshop, produced in the early to mid-1660s, that depict ladies of the court of King Charles II, some of whom were his mistresses. The name stems from the original location of the collection, which was at Windsor Castle. In 2022, they were on display at Hampton Court Palace.

A set of copies was commissioned by Robert Spencer, 2nd Earl of Sunderland in the 17th century for his collection at Althorp House, and the complete set can still be viewed there in the Picture Gallery, a room he created to show off his adoration for art.

The portraits

The Royal Collection includes 10 portraits as part of the set. They show the women at three-quarter length in various poses. Some women wear current fashions; others are draped in loose robes intended to evoke classical antiquity.

Originally commissioned by Anne Hyde, Duchess of York, the first mention of the paintings is by Samuel Pepys, describing them in his diary as being hung in "the Duke of York's room" in 1668. A 1674 inventory lists them as in the ducal rooms at St. James Palace; and by 1688 they had moved to the "Princess's dressing room" at Windsor Castle. Moved to the castle's state rooms during the 18th century, the Windsor Beauties were transferred to Hampton Court at some time prior to 1835.

List of "Beauties"
The original set of "Beauties" painted by Lely include, depending on the source, these 12 portraits:

Frances, Duchess of Richmond and Lennox (née Stuart)
Elizabeth, Countess de Gramont (née Hamilton)
Jane Myddelton (née Needham)
Margaret, Lady Denham (née Brooke; named Elizabeth in the cited printed sources [and in 18th century prints] but Margaret at the Royal Collection)
Frances, Lady Whitmore (née Brooke)
Mary, Countess of Falmouth and Dorset (née Bagot; named Elizabeth in the cited printed sources [and in 18th century prints] but Mary at the Royal Collection)
Henrietta, Countess of Rochester (née Boyle)
Barbara, Duchess of Cleveland (née Villiers)
Anne, Countess of Sunderland (née Digby)
Elizabeth, Countess of Northumberland (née Wriothesley)
Emilia Butler, Countess of Ossory  (Melville omits this name, citing Ernest Law that the portrait previously identified by this name is actually Lady Falmouth)
Madame Henrietta, Duchess of Orléans

The portraits for the first 10 names are included at the Royal Collection website as "probably commissioned by Anne Hyde, Duchess of York."

The Duchess of York does not figure in the above list often; but since she was largely responsible for the collection, and choosing the sitters, she was also painted as part of the series. Possibly a little flattery from Lely was responsible for this.

Gallery

See also
Hampton Court Beauties, a later set by Sir Godfrey Kneller, also on display at Hampton Court Palace
Gallery of Beauties, a still later set in Munich

References

External links
58 minute video by Dr Lawrence Shafe, "The Windsor Beauties at Hampton Court" 
Timms, Elizabeth Jane, "Looking at the Women behind the Windsor Beauties", 11 October 2017
Search for Windsor Beauties by Sir Peter Lely at the Royal Collection website, example (direct link)
The Windsor Beauties: Ladies of the Court of Charles II by Lewis Melville. Loving Healing Press, 2005. , .

Painting series
Paintings by Peter Lely
1660s paintings
Hampton Court Palace
Paintings in the Royal Collection of the United Kingdom
Women of the Stuart period
Sets of portraits
Mistresses of Charles II of England
Anne Hyde